Andreea Eugenia Munteanu (born 29 May 1998) is a Romanian artistic gymnast. She is a two-time European champion, with a team title in 2014 and a beam gold in 2015.

Junior career

2012 
In April 2012, Munteanu was named to the Romanian junior team for the 2012 European Women's Artistic Gymnastics Championships in Brussels. She helped the Romanian team finish in third place and she took home three medals: bronze in the all-around with a score of 54.857, silver on balance beam (14.433), and bronze on floor exercise (13.900, tied with Gabrielle Jupp of Great Britain).

2013 
In May 2013, Munteanu won the women's all-around title with a total score of 55.60 at the 10th Lugano Trophy in Lugano, Switzerland.

Senior career

2014 
Munteanu's senior debut came at the Cottbus World Cup in March 2014. Although she qualified first for both balance beam and floor exercise, she fell in both event finals. She won a bronze medal on beam with a score of 13.750, but finished fifth on floor (13.150). She competed in a mixed team, with Romanian teammates Stefania Stanila and Silvia Zarzu and gymnasts from Italy and the United States, at the City of Jesolo Trophy. The mixed team did not place in the team final, but Munteanu won gold on beam with a score of 14.833, bronze on floor with a score of 13.967, and placed thirteenth in the all-around (54.500). In April, she competed in a friendly meet against gymnasts from Belgium and France, winning team gold and placing sixth in the all-around.

She was selected to the Romanian team for the 2014 European Women's Artistic Gymnastics Championships in Sofia, Bulgaria. She helped Romania qualify in second place to the team final, and in the team final, she contributed scores of 14.933 on balance beam and 14.133 on floor toward Romania's first-place finish.

2015 
Munteanu once again used the Cottbus World Cup as her first meet of the season. She won gold on beam (14.400) and silver on floor (13.825) behind Marta Pihan-Kulesza. She then competed at the 2015 European Championships, and was the only Romanian female to qualify for any event finals. Munteanu went on to win the gold medal in the balance beam final with a 14.366 after qualifying in fourth. She finished eighth in the floor final with a 13.866.

Competitive history

References

External links 
 

1998 births
Living people
Romanian female artistic gymnasts
European champions in gymnastics
People from Gorj County
21st-century Romanian women